Acacia assimilis is a shrub or tree of the genus Acacia and the subgenus Plurinerves that is endemic to an area in the south-west of Australia.

Description
Like most species of Acacia it has phyllodes rather than new leaves. The glabrescent green phyllodes are patent to ascending with a filiform shape that is straight to slightly curved. It blooms from January to December and produces yellow flowers.

Taxonomy
There are two recognised varieties:
Acacia assimilis var. assimilis
Acacia assimilis var. atroviridis

Distribution
It is native to an area in the Wheatbelt, Great Southern  and Goldfields-Esperance regions of Western Australia where it is commonly situated on sandplains, in low-lying areas, among granite outcrops and on rocky hills growing in sandy or loamy-gravelly soils over granite or laterite..

See also
List of Acacia species

References

assimilis
Acacias of Western Australia
Plants described in 1920